Torkalaki (also Romanized as Torkālakī ) is a city in Aghili-ye Shomali Rural District, Aghili District, Gotvand County, Khuzestan Province, Iran. At the 2006 census, its population was 5,300, in 1,047 families.

References 

Populated places in Gotvand County
Cities in Khuzestan Province